Kiril Georgiev (born 16 August 1971) is a Bulgarian former cyclist. He competed in the track time trial at the 1992 Summer Olympics.

References

1971 births
Living people
Bulgarian male cyclists
Olympic cyclists of Bulgaria
Cyclists at the 1992 Summer Olympics
Place of birth missing (living people)